Mahmutbey is an underground station on the M3 and M7 lines of the Istanbul Metro in Bağcılar, Istanbul. The station is located beneath Bosna Avenue in the Göztepe neighborhood of Bağcılar. Mahmutbey was opened on 14 June 2013 along with the Kirazlı-MetroKent portion of the M3.

The station became the western terminus of the M7 line to Mecidiyeköy in 2020, when the M7 began operation.

References

External links
Mahmutbey station portal in Google Street View

Railway stations opened in 2013
Istanbul metro stations
2013 establishments in Turkey